Roger Lutz (born 15 July 1964) is a German former professional footballer who played as a defender.

Career
Born in Linden, Kaiserslautern, Lutz began playing football with local side FV Linden. From FK Clausen he moved to 1. FC Kaiserslautern in 1988, where he spent the rest of his Bundesliga career up to 2000. Lutz, as well as his brother Jürgen Lutz, interrupted his professional career in favor of his studies and thus gave up voluntarily on his best years as a professional to obtain a diploma in civil engineering (playing as an amateur during the time). Then he returned to win his second German championship. Together with his cousin Kai, himself a regionally well-known football player, he still operates an engineering office.

Lutz won the German championship twice (1991, 1998) and twice the DFB-Pokal (1990, 1996). He is besides Axel Roos the most successful FCK player in terms of titles won. He finished his career in Luxembourg with the F91 Dudelange. From 2002 to 2004, Lutz was on the supervisory board of the FCK.

Since 2004, he worked as manager at F91 Dudelange, Jeunesse Esch and SC Hauenstein. From June 2007 to February 2008, he worked as assistant to manager Kjetil Rekdal at 1. FC Kaiserslautern. Shortly after his release he was hired again as assistant to the new manager Milan Šašić.

Honours
1. FC Kaiserslautern
 Bundesliga: 1990–91, 1997–98
 DFB-Pokal: 1989–90, 1995–96
 DFL-Supercup: 1991

References

External links
 

1964 births
Living people
German footballers
Association football defenders
1. FC Kaiserslautern II players
1. FC Kaiserslautern players
F91 Dudelange players
Bundesliga players
2. Bundesliga players
German football managers
F91 Dudelange managers
Jeunesse Esch managers
German expatriate footballers
German expatriate sportspeople in Luxembourg
Expatriate footballers  in Luxembourg
People from Kaiserslautern
Footballers from Rhineland-Palatinate